Kemp v Santam Insurance Co Ltd and Another is an important case in the South African law of delict. It was heard in the Cape Provincial Division by Diemont J on 5 and 6 November, and 11 to 13 December 1974. Judgment was handed down on 12 February 1975. The plaintiff was represented by LA Rose-Innes, SC, and with him IG Farlam. His attorneys were Silberbauers. The defendant was represented by GD Griessel, and his attorneys were Jan S. de Villiers & Sons. Attorneys for the third party to the case were Truter & Lombard, and they were represented by Edwin A. Kellaway.

The case concerned an action for damages. Diemont J determined that, if part of the mechanism or the equipment or the accessories to a motor vehicle become detached while the vehicle is being driven and cause injury to a third party, the injury "arises out of" the driving of the vehicle, within the meaning of that phrase in section 11(1) of the Motor Vehicle Insurance Act.

References

Cases 
 Philander v Allied Assurance Co. Ltd. 1963 (1) SA 561 (C).
 Pretoria City Council v Auto Protection A Insurance Co. Ltd. 1963 (3) SA 136 (T).
 Roos v A. A. Mutual Insurance Association Ltd. 1974 (4) SA 295 (C).
 Santam Versekeringsmaatskappy Bpk. v Kemp 1971 (3) SA 305 (AD).
 Wells and Another v Shield Insurance Co Ltd and Others 1965 (2) SA 865 (C).

Statutes 
 Motor Vehicle Insurance Act 29 of 1942.

Notes 

Appellate Division (South Africa) cases
1975 in South African law
1975 in case law
South African delict case law